Kirshina is a rural locality (a village) in Oshibskoye Rural Settlement, Kudymkarsky District, Perm Krai, Russia. The population was 95 as of 2010. There are 10 streets.

Geography 
Kirshina is located 37 km north of Kudymkar (the district's administrative centre) by road. Malakhova is the nearest rural locality.

References 

Rural localities in Kudymkarsky District